Enrico Caetani (6 August 1550 – 13 December 1599) was an Italian cardinal.

Early life
He was born at Sermoneta, the second son of Bonifacio, lord of Sermoneta, and Caterina di Alberto Pio, daughter of the lord of Carpi. He was the nephew of Cardinal Niccolò Caetani, and brother of Camillo Caetani.

On 11 Aug 1585, he was consecrated bishop by Giulio Antonio Santorio, Cardinal-Priest of San Bartolomeo all'Isola, with Massimiliano Palumbara, Archbishop of Benevento, Annibale de Capua, Archbishop of Naples, and Guillaume Damasi Van der Linden, Bishop of Roermond, serving as co-consecrators.

Pope Sixtus V gave him the title of cardinal on 18 December 1585. In the same year he was appointed as Latin Patriarch of Alexandria, a position he held until 1587. In 1585 to 1587 he was legate in Bologna, and recommended Galileo Galilei to the university there in 1588. The chair, however, went to Giovanni Antonio Magini.

Diplomat in France

In 1589 Caetani led the papal diplomatic mission to France sent to defend the Catholic church position during the French wars of religion. He was accompanied by Lorenzo Bianchetti, Robert Bellarmine and others in a strong delegation. Caetani supported the Catholic League and the Spanish interest against Henry of Navarre. In March 1590 he presided over a ceremony in which militia and city officials took an oath to defend Paris against Henry. He blessed in May the monastic forces raised by Guillaume Rose for the defence. He was a defender during the Siege of Paris that year, spending heavily.

Later life
After the death of William Allen in 1594, there was no generally acceptable candidate as successor, to lead the English mission. Caetani took on the role of Cardinal Protector. He then appointed George Blackwell as archpriest for England. He served as legate a latere in Poland from 3 April 1596 until 23 June 1597.

He died in Rome in 1599.

References

External links
WorldCat page
 treccani.it biography

1550 births
1599 deaths
Enrico
People from the Province of Latina
16th-century Italian cardinals
16th-century Italian diplomats
Diplomats of the Holy See
16th-century Italian Roman Catholic bishops